Crambus rickseckerellus is a moth in the family Crambidae. It was described by Alexander Barrett Klots in 1940. It is found in the US state of California.

References

Crambini
Moths described in 1940
Moths of North America